Picnic Island is a small island off the coast of Tasmania. The name may also refer to:
Picnic Islands, part of the city of Miami
Sheep Island (Washington), also known as Picnic Island
"Picnic Island", a song by Jeff Watson from his album Lone Ranger